Bella is a brand of feminine hygiene products, including maxi pads, ultra thin pads, and female wipes. Bella is currently owned by Polish company Toruńskie Zakłady Materiałów Opatrunkowych (TZMO SA).

Background
Bella is a brand of hygienic products for women – the market leader in Central and Eastern Europe, rapidly conquering the markets of Western Europe and Asia. Under the sign of Bella sold a wide range of products: sanitary napkins, panty liners, tampons and other feminine hygiene products.
The range of hygiene products for women was founded in 1976, when in Toruń Plant Materials Opatrunkowych began production of sanitary napkins called Donna. From those distant days, the quality of products continues to grow. There was also a modification of the name – Donna pads were marked with the name Bella Donna, which in Italian means "beautiful woman" and introduced the name Bella.

Products

Bella – traditional sanitary pads
Bella Perfecta – ultrathin sanitary pads
Bella for Teens – sanitary pads, pantyliners and tampons for teenagers
Bella Herbs – traditional maxi pads with different plant extracts (tilia, verbena, plantago)
Bella Panty – pantyliners
Bella Tampo – tampons
Bella Control – incontinence products for women

Gallery

See also
Aisle (company)
Hengan International
Libresse
Lil-lets
Niine
O.b. (brand)
Thinx

References

External links
Official website

Feminine hygiene brands